Senator Grady may refer to:

John C. Grady (1847–1916), Pennsylvania State Senate
Thomas F. Grady (1853–1912), New York State Senate